ITAC may refer to:

 Integrated Threat Assessment Centre
 Integrated Terrorism Assessment Centre
 Information Technology Architect Certification